Electric Avenue is a street in Brixton, London. Built in the 1880s, it was the first market street to be lit by electric lights (The first street to be lit by an incandescent lightbulb was Mosley Street, in Newcastle upon Tyne). Today, Electric Avenue contains various food and domestic provisions retailers, and hosts a part of Brixton Market which specialises in selling a mix of African, Caribbean, South American and Asian products. It is located just around the corner from Brixton Underground station (1972). The street originally had elegant cast iron Victorian canopies over the pavements which were removed and destroyed in the 1980s.

History
The road is referenced in Eddy Grant's 1983 single "Electric Avenue", which reached #2 on both the UK and US singles charts. The song itself was inspired by the 1981 Brixton riot.

On 17 April 1999, the neo-Nazi bomber David Copeland planted a nail bomb outside a supermarket in Brixton Road with the intention of igniting a race war across Britain. A market trader became suspicious and moved the device to a less crowded area of Electric Avenue, where 39 people were injured in its explosion.

In 2016, Eddy Grant was invited to switch on a new illuminated street sign, installed as part of a £1 million refurbishment. Afterwards, Grant was given one of the previous signs as a keepsake.

Notes

References

Brixton local history with photos
Photos from 1904 and 2003

Streets in the London Borough of Lambeth
Brixton
History of the London Borough of Lambeth